The Acropolis International Tournament 2007 was a basketball tournament held in OAKA Indoor Hall in Athens, Greece, from August 20 until August 22, 2007. This was the 21st edition of the Acropolis International Basketball Tournament. The four participating teams were Greece, Lithuania, Slovenia and Italy.

Venues

Participating teams

Standings 

|-bgcolor="gold"

|}

Results 
All times are local Central European Summer Time (UTC+2).

Final standing

References

External links
Basket.gr Acropolis Cup History Search Results 
Acropolis Cup 2007 Results

Acropolis International Basketball Tournament
2006–07 in Greek basketball
2006–07 in Italian basketball
2006–07 in Lithuanian basketball
2006–07 in Slovenian basketball